Pokerville (also, Puckerville) is a former settlement in Amador County, California. It lay at an elevation of 1040 feet (317 m). It was superseded by Plymouth.

References

Former settlements in Amador County, California
Former populated places in California